Bosnia and Herzegovina maintains an embassy in Riyadh and Saudi Arabia maintains an embassy in Sarajevo. Saudi Arabia has provided enormous financial assistance, cultural and humanitarian support to Bosnia since its independence in 1992. The King Fahd Mosque, the largest mosque in Sarajevo, was funded by the Saudi government and is named after its former king, Fahd bin Abdulaziz Al Saud.

See also 
 Foreign relations of Bosnia and Herzegovina
 Foreign relations of Saudi Arabia
 Yugoslavia and the Non-Aligned Movement

References

 
Saudi Arabia
Bilateral relations of Saudi Arabia